Illam is a 1988 Indian Tamil-language film directed by I. V. Sasi, starring Sivakumar and Amala. The film was a remake of the Malayalam film Sanmanassullavarkku Samadhanam. It was released on 12 August 1988.

Plot

Cast 
Sivakumar as Mayilsamy
Amala as Saradha
Chandrasekhar
Srikanth
Y. G. Mahendra

Soundtrack 
The music composed by Ilaiyaraaja.

Reception 
The Indian Express compared the film's plot to Veedu: "Illam is unlike Veedu in many ways [..] it does not have anchoring in social factors [..] and is mainly interested in the melodramatic aspects of the plot". Amala won the Best Actress Special Award at the 9th Cinema Express Awards.

References

External links 
 

1980s Tamil-language films
1987 films
Films directed by I. V. Sasi
Films scored by Ilaiyaraaja
Indian drama films
Tamil remakes of Malayalam films